Mae Fa Luang is a district (amphoe) in the northern part of Chiang Rai province, northern Thailand.

History
The area of Mae Fa Luang was separated from Mae Chan district and created as a minor district (king amphoe) on 1 April 1992. Originally it was composed of the three tambons, Thoet Thai, Mae Salong Nai, and Mae Salong Nok. A fourth sub-district, Mae Fa Luang, was created in 1996. The minor district was upgraded to a full district on 5 December 1996.

Etymology
The name Mae Fa Luang was given by Princess Mother Srinagarindra, who was commonly known as "Mae Fa Luang" (lit. 'royal mother from the sky') by the hill tribespeople of the area.

Geography

Neighboring districts are (from the east clockwise): Mae Sai, Mae Chan, and Mueang Chiang Rai of Chiang Rai Province and Mae Ai of Chiang Mai province. To the northwest is the Shan State of Myanmar.

Administration

Central administration 
Mae Fa Luang is divided into four subdistricts (tambons), which are further subdivided into 77 administrative villages (mubans).

Local administration 
There are four subdistrict administrative organizations (SAO) in the district:
 Thoet Thai consisting of subdistrict Thoet Thai.
 Mae Salong Nai consisting of subdistrict Mae Salong Nai.
 Mae Salong Nok consisting of subdistrict Mae Salong Nok.
 Mae Fa Luang consisting of subdistrict Mae Fa Luang.

References

External links

amphoe.com

Mae Fa Luang